This is a list of French television related events from 2002.

Events
12 January - Jenifer Bartoli wins the first series of Star Academy.
4 July - Karine Delgado and Thomas Saillofest win the second and final series of Loft Story.
21 December - Nolwenn Leroy wins the second series of Star Academy.

Debuts

Television shows

1940s
Le Jour du Seigneur (1949–present)

1950s
Présence protestante (1955-)

1970s
30 millions d'amis (1976-2016)

1990s
Sous le soleil (1996-2008)

2000s
Star Academy (2001-2008, 2012-2013)

Ending this year
Loft Story (2001-2002)

Births

Deaths

Jacques Rouland

See also
2002 in France

References